Sidhi is a town and a municipality in Sidhi district in the Indian state of Madhya Pradesh. It is the headquarters of the Sidhi district.

Geography
It has an average elevation of 272 metres (892 feet) and covers a geographical area of 10,536 km2.
It is a state of Chandela Rajputs who came from Khajuraho. They mainly live in Bardi State and then again divide into a few areas in Sidhi.

Climate

Transportation

Closest Airport to Sidhi is in Prayagraj which is 147 kilometers (91 miles) away and has flights to major destinations such as Delhi, Bangaluru, Mumbai, Kolkata etc.
Closest railway station is Madwas and  Joba which is respectively 50 and 60 km away from the city.

Demographics
As of the 2001 India census, Sidhi had a population of 45,664 with males constituting 54% of the population, females 46%. Sidhi has an average literacy rate of 69%, higher than the national average of 59.5%: male literacy is 77%, and female literacy is 60%. In Sidhi, 15% of the population is under 6 years of age.

Notable people

 Birbal Birthplace is Ghoghra Sidhi, and his career started from here before moving to Mughal Emperor Akbar's court.
 Arjun Singh former CM of Madhya Pradesh
 Govind Mishra, Member of Parliament, Parliamentary Constituency No. 11 Sidhi
 Ajay Singh, former cabinet minister in Madhya Pradesh Govt., Leader of opposition; Member of Legislative Assembly, Assembly Constituency No. 11
 Riti Pathak,  Parliamentary Constituency No. 11 Sidhi
 Kunwar Singh Tekam, Former Chairman Of National Commission For Scheduled Tribes; Member Of Legislative Assembly Constituency No. 82 Dhauhani Madhya Pradesh 
 Satish Agnihotri, chief justice of sikkim state born at Rampur Naikin tehsil and primary studied at Govt H S School Rampur Naikin

References

 
Sidhi district